Leander Henry Perez Sr. (July 16, 1891 – March 19, 1969) was an American Democratic Party political boss of Plaquemines and St. Bernard parishes in southeastern Louisiana during the middle third of the 20th century. Officially, he served as a district judge, later as district attorney, and as president of the Plaquemines Parish Commission Council. He was known for leading efforts to enforce and preserve segregation.

Early life and education
Perez was born in the community of Dalcour, on the east bank of Plaquemines Parish, to Roselius E. "Fice" Perez (died 1939) and the former Gertrude Solis (died 1944). The Perez and Solis families were Isleños, an ethnic community descended from settlers from the Canary Islands, Spain. Perez was educated in New Orleans schools, Louisiana State University at Baton Rouge, and the Tulane University Law School in New Orleans. Perez opened a law practice in New Orleans and in Plaquemines Parish.

Political career
In 1919, Judge Perez launched a reign of bought elections and strictly enforced segregation by ensuring laws were enacted on his fiat and rubber-stamped by the parish governing councils. Elections under Perez's reign were sometimes blatantly falsified, with voting records appearing in alphabetical order and names of national celebrities such as Babe Ruth, Charlie Chaplin, and Herbert Hoover appearing on the rolls. Perez-endorsed candidates often won with 90% or more of the ballots. Those who appeared to vote were intimidated by Perez's enforcers. He sent large tough men into the voting booths to "help" people vote. Many voters were bribed. Perez testified that he bribed voters $2, $5, and $10 to vote his way, depending on who they were.

Perez took action to suppress African-Americans from voting within his domain, but most were already disenfranchised due to the state constitution passed at the turn of the century, which added requirements for payment of poll taxes and passing literacy tests in order to register to vote. Subjective and discriminatory treatment by white registrars prevented most blacks from registering.

Illegal oil deals
Starting in 1936, Perez diverted millions from government funds through illegal land deals. When he was a district attorney, he was the legal adviser to the Plaquemines levee boards. He used this position to negotiate payoffs between corporations he set up and the big oil companies that leased the levee board lands for drilling. "As early as 1941, Perez's ties to companies involved in lucrative mineral leases were under investigation. In 1983, it was discovered that $80 million in oil royalties had been paid to Delta Development Co., which Perez secretly owned. After Perez's death, the parish government sued his heirs, seeking restitution of $82 million in government funds. In 1987, the lawsuit was settled for $12 million.

Segregationist
In the 1950s and 1960s, Perez gained attention as a nationally prominent opponent of desegregation, taking a leadership role in the southern Massive Resistance to change, particularly following the 1954 U.S. Supreme Court decision in Brown v. Board of Education, which ruled that segregation of public schools was unconstitutional. Perez helped organize the White Citizens' Councils, white supremacist "front organizations for the Ku Klux Klan", among them the Citizens' Council of Greater New Orleans. Perez researched and wrote much of the legislation sponsored by Louisiana's Joint Legislative Committee on Segregation.

Perez tried to control the activities of civil rights workers by prohibiting outsiders from entering Plaquemines Parish via the bayou ferries, which were the chief way to cross rivers and enter the jurisdiction.

In 1960, while opposing desegregation of New Orleans public schools, Perez spoke provocatively at a rally in the city. His speech is credited with catalyzing a mob assault on the school administration building by some 2,000 white men, who were fought off by police using fire hoses. The mob ran through the city and attacked African Americans on the streets. When the schools were reopened, Perez organized a boycott by white residents. His group made threats to whites who allowed their children to attend desegregated schools. Perez arranged for poor whites to attend a segregated private school without charge, and he helped to establish a new whites-only private school in New Orleans. The Roman Catholic Church supported desegregation, and integrated its parochial schools. The bishop of New Orleans excommunicated Perez for his overt opposition to the church's teachings.

His legislative ally, E. W. Gravolet of Pointe à la Hache, tried without success to pass grants-in-aid bills to provide state assistance to private schools that were founded to avoid desegregation, known as segregation academies.

Civil rights activists tried to work through the barriers to register African-American voters and enable them to vote. In the summer of 1963, from July through August, activists of the Congress for Racial Equality (CORE) came to Plaquemines Parish to run a voter registration drive for African Americans. About 45 members, both black and white, came to work in the parish and organize local people for voter registration classes, peaceful marches, and drives to register. In a short time, 300 CORE activists and local people were arrested for peaceful protest, but CORE leaders negotiated with the local sheriff and mayor to permit some actions. After training and concerted action, a number of local African Americans did succeed in registering to vote, although many were still prevented, on largely specious grounds for failing to answer questions about the state constitution. The movement also worked to get Seymourville and Dupont Annex included within the city boundaries; the city was trying to exclude these majority-black communities from being incorporated in order to prevent black votes from being counted for election of the city commission. Voting rights work took place in other nearby parishes as well; in October an African-American man was the first of his race to register to vote in West Feliciana Parish since the early years following disenfranchisement.

The Civil Rights Act of 1964 ended legal segregation, and the Voting Rights Act of 1965 authorized federal oversight and enforcement of voter registration and elections in jurisdictions with historic under-representation of elements of the population. Expanded voter registration drives took place and, after 1965, African Americans in Louisiana began to participate again in the political system and exercise their constitutional rights.

Excommunication
In 1962, the Archdiocese of New Orleans announced its plan to desegregate the New Orleans parochial school system for the 1962–1963 school year. Perez led a movement to pressure businesses into firing any whites who allowed their children to attend the newly desegregated Catholic schools. Catholics in St. Bernard Parish boycotted one school, which the archdiocese kept open without students for four months; it burned down in what was suspected as arson. In response, Archbishop Joseph Rummel excommunicated Perez and two other opponents of integration on April 16, 1962.

Perez described himself at one point as "a Catholic, but not an Archbishop's Catholic." He eventually reconciled with the Catholic Church and was readmitted before his death after issuing a retraction, and through political leverage exercised by Democratic senator James Eastland.  Perez received a requiem Mass at Holy Name of Jesus Christ Church at Loyola University in New Orleans.

Personal life
In 1917, Perez married Agnes Octave Chalin. They had four children; two sons and two daughters.

Legacy and honors
"What Color Are You", a 1966 folk song by Bob Lind, was written "to [Perez] and people like him", criticizing Perez's segregationist ideology.
In 1970, Judge Perez Drive, a major thoroughfare in St. Bernard Parish, was named after him (it was formerly Goodchildren Drive). In 1999, the road was rededicated with the same name as an honor for the late Melvyn Perez, a long-time judge in St. Bernard Parish. (In 1978, nine years after Leander Perez's death, the Louisiana legislature had designated St. Bernard Parish as its own judicial district. Melvyn Perez served there.)

References

Further reading

Books

AV Media

Websites

External links 
FBI file on Leander Perez

1891 births
1969 deaths
Hispanic and Latino American mayors
American political bosses from Louisiana
Louisiana Democrats
Louisiana Dixiecrats
Louisiana Isleño people
American people of Spanish descent
Louisiana state court judges
People temporarily excommunicated by the Catholic Church
Politicians from New Orleans
People from St. Bernard Parish, Louisiana
People from Plaquemines Parish, Louisiana
Tulane University alumni
Tulane University Law School alumni
Citizens' Councils
Old Right (United States)
Lawyers from New Orleans
Neo-Confederates
Catholics from Louisiana
School segregation in the United States
20th-century American judges
20th-century American lawyers